Blue Gold is a novel by Clive Cussler and Paul Kemprecos published in 2000.

Blue Gold or Blue gold may also refer to:

 Blue Gold: The Right to Stop the Corporate Theft of the World's Water, a book by Maude Barlow and Tony Clarke
 Blue Gold: World Water Wars, a 2008 documentary based on the book
 Blue gold, a type of colored gold

See also
 Gold (disambiguation)
 Water politics
 Cobalt